is a Japanese actor and entertainer who was represented by Hori Agency.

Biography
In 2014, Tsurugi was a finalist in the 27th Junon Super Boy Contest. He later signed to Hori Agency. Since February 2016, he has made regular appearances in Doubutsu Sentai Zyuohger as Tusk (Zyuoh Elephant).

Filmography

TV series

Advertisements

Film

Video game

References

External links
 

21st-century Japanese male actors
Japanese entertainers
1996 births
Living people
People from Fukuoka Prefecture
Actors from Fukuoka Prefecture